The Quail Mountains are located southwest of Death Valley National Park in eastern California, USA. The range lies to the north of the Granite Mountains and south of the Owlshead Mountains, and reaches an elevation of 1,555 meters above sea level.

The mountains lie along the border of Death Valley National Park and the Naval Air Weapons Station China Lake, which is a restricted area.  The Slate Range is to the northwest.

References

California Road and Recreation Atlas, 2005, pg.96

Death Valley
Mountain ranges of the Mojave Desert
Protected areas of the Mojave Desert
Mountain ranges of San Bernardino County, California